Isa Pa with Feelings is a 2019 Filipino romantic comedy film. It stars Maine Mendoza and Carlo Aquino and was directed by Prime Cruz. It was released on October 16, 2019, under distribution of Star Cinema and it was produced by Black Sheep Productions. As of April 20, 2021, it is available on Netflix.

Plot 

An architect student, Mara, takes a break from studying by dancing at her balcony where her next door neighbor happens to see her. She turns around mid-dancing to find him smiling and she retreats back inside feeling embarrassed. After her exams, she visits her family in the countryside where a billboard of her face congratulating her passing of the exam is in front of the house for all to see. She enters the house to argue about it but when her dad justifies it as a sure-thing because she is making his dreams come true, she leaves him be. As more family show up, she turns her attention to Hailey, her deaf niece. She tells both her and her mom that she has signed up for sign language class to communicate with Hailey much to the family's delight.

When Mara enters the architecture firm where she's been interning, her co-interns ignore her greetings and turn away. She finds out that she failed her board exams. She shows up to sign language class and her teacher turns out to be her next door neighbor, Gali. They formally introduce themselves and proceed to learn basic sign language phrases. When she flatly signs the phrase "I'm sorry", Gali presses her to do the sign again "with feelings" because facial expressions are key to communicating in sign language.

They become friends and slowly fall in love. Eventually, they realize how their deaf and hearing worlds could drive each other apart.

Cast 

Maine Mendoza as Mara Navarro
Carlo Aquino as Gali Pastrano
Cris Villanueva as Bert Navarro
Lotlot de Leon as 	Angie Navarro
Nikki Valdez as Stella Navarro
Kat Galang as Ira
Vangie Labalan as Lita
Geleen Eugenio as Teacher Laura
Arci Muñoz as Annica
Rafa Siguion-Reyna as Vincent

References

External links 

Cinematic Trailer

2019 films
Filipino-language films
Philippine romantic comedy films
Philippine Sign-language films
Films about deaf people